The women's individual pursuit at the 2022 Commonwealth Games was part of the cycling programme, which took place on 30 July 2022, at the Lee Valley VeloPark, Stratford, London, England.

Records
Prior to this competition, the existing world and Games records were as follows:

Schedule
The schedule is as follows:

All times are British Summer Time (UTC+1)

Results

Qualifying
The two fastest riders advanced to the gold medal final. The next two fastest riders advanced to the bronze medal final.

Finals

References

Women's individual pursuit
Cycling at the Commonwealth Games – Women's individual pursuit
Comm